Kangolabad (also Romanized as Kangolābād; also known as Gangalābād, Gangazu, Gangelo, Gangolābād, and Sheyţān Kand) is a village in Azghan Rural District, in the Central District of Ahar County, East Azerbaijan Province, Iran. At the 2006 census, its population was 578, in 119 families.

References 

Populated places in Ahar County